Bigi Wey Sports Center is a sports venue located in Brokopondo District, Suriname.  It hosted a knockout tournament marking the 150th-anniversary of Suriname's emancipation day.

In 2009, the Ilonka Elmont Foundation conducted a research into sports venues, sports needs and sports participation in Brownsweg. They inferred that Brownsweg needed a sports venue and planned to make one. The construction was a joint project of Rosabel Goldmines, the Ilonka Elmont Foundation and the KNVB (Royal Dutch Football Federation).

Construction

Constructed in 2010, it was officially opened with a ceremony in 2012. Unsuitable weather forced the inspection of the field to be rescheduled.

The construction cost amounted to over 625,000 dollars in total.

Facilities

The complex contains a field with floodlights for competitive games, a cafeteria, a first aid room, storage space, two restrooms and a parking lot.

References

Brokopondo District
Football venues in Suriname
Sports venues in Suriname